Charles Ernest "Spider" Wilhelm (May 23, 1929 – October 20, 1992) was an American professional baseball player who played in seven games for the Philadelphia Athletics during the  season.  He also played professionally in Cuba.
He was born in Baltimore, Maryland and died in Venice, Florida at the age of 63.

References

External links

Baseball players from Baltimore
Philadelphia Athletics players
Columbus Jets players
1929 births
1992 deaths
Federalsburg A's players
Buffalo Bisons (minor league) players
Youngstown A's players
American expatriate baseball players in Panama
Knoxville Smokies players
Columbia Gems players
Savannah A's players
Little Rock Travelers players
Amarillo Gold Sox players
Corpus Christi Giants players
Lincoln A's players